GNAT is a free-software compiler for the Ada programming language which forms part of the GNU Compiler Collection (GCC). It supports all versions of the language, i.e. Ada 2012, Ada 2005, Ada 95 and Ada 83. Originally its name was an acronym that stood for GNU NYU Ada Translator, but that name no longer applies. The front-end and run-time are written in Ada.

History 

The GNAT project started in 1992 when the United States Air Force awarded New York University (NYU) a contract to build a free compiler for Ada to help with the Ada 9X standardization process. The 3-million-dollar contract required the use of the GNU GPL for all development, and assigned the copyright to the Free Software Foundation. The first official validation of GNAT occurred in 1995.

In 1994 and 1996, the original authors of GNAT  founded two sister companies, Ada Core Technologies in New York City and ACT-Europe (later AdaCore SAS) in Paris, to provide continuing development and commercial support of GNAT. The two companies always operated as one entity, but did not formally unify until 2012 as AdaCore.

GNAT was initially released separately from the main GCC sources. On October 2, 2001, the GNAT sources were contributed to the GCC CVS repository. The last version to be released separately was GNAT 3.15p, based on GCC 2.8.1, on October 2, 2002. Starting with GCC 3.4, on major platforms the official GCC release is able to pass 100% of the ACATS Ada tests included in the GCC testsuite. By GCC 4.0, more exotic platforms were also able to pass 100% of the ACATS tests.

License 

The compiler is licensed under the terms of the GNU GPL 3+ with GCC Runtime Library Exception.

All versions leading up to and including 3.15p are licensed under the GMGPL offering similar runtime exceptions. The GMGPL license is GNU GPL 2 with a linking exception that permits software with licenses that are incompatible with the GPL to be linked with the output of Ada standard generic libraries that are supplied with GNAT without breaching the license agreement.

Versions 

FSF GNAT is part of most major Linux or BSD distributions and is included in the main GCC Sources.

GNAT Pro is a supported version of GNAT from AdaCore.

In addition to FSF GNAT and AdaCore's GNAT Pro, AdaCore releases additional versions (GNAT-GPL, a public older version of GNAT Pro, and GNAT GAP, a version for AdaCore's educational programs). These AdaCore versions have the runtime exceptions removed, this requires software that is linked with the standard libraries to have GPL-compatible licenses to avoid being in breach of the license agreement.

JGNAT was a GNAT version that compiled from the Ada programming language to Java bytecode.
GNAT for dotNET is a GNAT version that compiles from the Ada programming language to Common Language Infrastructure for the .NET Framework and the free and open source implementations Mono and Portable.NET.

See also 

 AdaGIDE
 GCC
 GCJ
 GFortran
 PolyORB
 GNAT Programming Studio
 SPARK (programming language)

References

Further reading

External links 

 History of the GNAT Project
 GNAT in the GCC wiki
 FSF GNAT installation instructions for major platforms
 The GNU Ada Project — more FSF versions of GNAT
 Debian Ada Policy — packaging of GNAT and other Ada programs in Debian
 Write It in Ada — Run It on the Java Virtual Machine

Ada (programming language)
Free compilers and interpreters
Free software programmed in Ada
GNU Project software
New York University
Software using the GPL linking exception